Danielle Spencer may refer to:

Danielle Spencer (American actress) (born 1965), African-American actress
Danielle Spencer (Australian actress) (born 1969), Australian songwriter, recording artist and actress

See also
Daniel Spencer (disambiguation)
Spencer (surname)